Estonian Education and Research Network (EENet) is a structural unit of the Information Technology Foundation for Education (HITSA) whose main goal is to ensure the development and stable functioning of the information technology infrastructure necessary for research, education and culture.

Field of operation and objectives 

EENet operates in the field of the development and administration of the information technology infrastructure of Estonian education, research and culture. EENet ensures the functioning of a data network corresponding to the specific needs of Estonian academic institutions and the development thereof in accordance with the development of technology; as well the provision of data communications and content services corresponding to the needs of research and education and promotion of the use of information technology.

Main operations 

 Management of the optical data network and Internet connectivity up to 10 Gbit/s
 Distributed computing resources (Estonian Scientific Computing Infrastructure, Estonian Grid)
 Webhosting, virtual environment for education (HAVIKE), virtual learning environments and educational content 
 Mailboxes and mailing lists 
 Domain registration (.ee, .edu.ee, .org.ee, etc.)
 Authentication and identity management (eduroam, TAAT and certificate services) 
 Virtual private server; server housing
 Stratum 1 NTP server, IPv4 and IPv6 allocation

Collaboration and projects 

 GÉANT (project GN4) -  is the 500 Gbit/s pan-European research and education network that interconnects Europe's National Research and Education Networks (NRENs). Former GÉANT projects: GN3plus (2014-2015), GN3 (2010-2013), GÉANT2 (2004–2009), GÉANT (2000–2004)
 EGI - European Grid Infrastructure
 EUMETCAST - EUMETSAT's primary dissemination mechanism for the near real-time delivery of satellite data and products
 Estonian Research and Education Optical Backbone Network (2011–2013)
 Estonian Scientific Computing Infrastructure (2011–2013)
 DC-NET - Digital Cultural heritage NETwork is an ERA-NET (European Research Area Network) project (2009–2011)
 Distributed computing projects BalticGrid (2005–2008) and BalticGrid-II (2008–2010)
 Porta Optica Study (2005-2007) - Distributed Optical Gateway to Eastern Europe
 BALTnet (1993–2001) - Networking project funded by the Nordic Council of Ministers to establish communication services in the Baltic countries
 FEMIRC Eesti (1997–1998) - EC Innovation Relay Centre in Estonia

History 

The Estonian Education and Research Network (EENet) was established in August 1993 as a governmental non-profit organization. From 1997 until April 2013 EENet operated as a state agency administered by the Estonian Ministry of Education and Research.

In April, 2013 EENet was transferred to the Information Technology Foundation for Education with all current rights of representation in international organisations.

EENet managed the Estonian top level domain (.ee) and the Registry during 1993–2013.

See also
 Internet in Estonia
 Communications in Estonia

References

External links
 Official website

Communications in Estonia
Education in Estonia
Government research
Internet in Estonia
Internet mirror services
National research and education networks